Wild Country is a major manufacturer of rock climbing equipment, and is most noted for introducing the Friend, a spring-loaded camming device. The company is based in Tideswell in the English Peak District, close to some of the UK's most popular climbing areas.

Wild Country was founded in 1977 by British climber Mark Vallance, after he met American climber Ray Jardine who had made and used prototypes of the camming devices he had invented but could find nobody to produce them in volume. Vallance was convinced of their commercial potential and, with the collaboration of Jardine, set up a factory in the Peak District to manufacture the devices which they had for a long time called Friends. Friends, though expensive, became immediately popular with climbers, selling over 5 thousand units in the first year, and establishing Wild Country as a major climbing gear manufacturer. Soon the company started expanding its range which now includes climbing harnesses, nuts, carabiners, and other climbing equipment. In 1986 Wild Country acquired Clog, a Welsh climbing equipment manufacturer; the Clog brand is now used to market some of Wild Country's cheaper ranges of equipment. The company also distributes various other international climbing brands in the UK.
In 1979 Vallance, introduced the Wild Country Rocks; passive protection which used three contact points compared to the usual two of other designs.  The range of classic nuts has now been superseded by anodised rocks, which feature coloured anodising on the material to make identification easier .  Both these ranges are produced in China, though their smaller superlight range is still produced in the UK.For a while they also produced tents, backpacks, and technical clothing.

His book describing the creation of the company, "Wild Country: The man who made Friends" 
 
was shortlisted for the Boardman Tasker Prize for Mountain Literature. The Boardman Tasker Award for Mountain Literature is awarded annually to the author or authors of the best literary work, whether fiction, non-fiction, drama or poetry, the central theme of which is concerned with the mountain environment.  In the book he also mentions his numerous Wild Country sponsored Himalayan climbing expeditions, most notably to Broad Peak.
 

In February 2012 Wild Country was bought by Italian climbing equipment manufacturer Salewa.

References

External links
Wild Country website

Climbing and mountaineering equipment companies